Heribert Weber (born 28 June 1955 in Pöls) is a retired Austrian football defender and later a football manager. He currently works as Sky Austria's main pundit and analyst for their coverage of the Austrian Football Bundesliga, the UEFA Champions League and the UEFA Europa League.

Club career
Born in Styria, Weber started his professional career at Sturm Graz and joined Vienna giants Rapid Wien after the World Cup in 1978. He played a major part in the most successful of Rapid teams in the 1980s, claiming the League crown four times, winning 4 domestic cups and most prominently losing the UEFA Cup Winners Cup Final in 1985 against Everton. He skippered Rapid in 1981 and from 1986 through 1989. He was voted in Rapid's Team of the Century in 1999.

At the end of his career he moved to SV Salzburg, with whom he won another league title during the club's most successful period. In 1994, he played with them in the UEFA Cup final against Inter Milan.

International career
He made his debut for Austria in an April 1976 friendly match against Sweden and was a participant at the 1978 FIFA World Cup and at the 1982 FIFA World Cup. He earned 68 caps, scoring one goal. His final international game was an October 1989 World Cup qualification match against Turkey.

Coaching career
As a football coach he coached SV Salzburg with whom he won another league title, Rapid Wien and 1. FC Saarbrücken (Germany).

Honours

as a player
Austrian Football Bundesliga (5):
 1982, 1983, 1987, 1988, 1994
Austrian Cup (1):
 1983, 1984, 1985, 1987

as a manager
Austrian Football Bundesliga (1):
 1997

External links
Rapid stats – Rapid Archiv

References

1955 births
Living people
People from Murtal District
Austrian footballers
Austria international footballers
1978 FIFA World Cup players
1982 FIFA World Cup players
SK Sturm Graz players
SK Rapid Wien players
FC Red Bull Salzburg players
Austrian Football Bundesliga players
Austrian football managers
SK Rapid Wien managers
Association football defenders
Footballers from Styria
Austrian television presenters
Austrian expatriate sportspeople in Germany
Austrian expatriate football managers
Association football coaches
Expatriate football managers in Germany